Atimiini is a tribe of beetles in the subfamily Spondylidinae, containing the following genera and species:

 Genus Atimia
 Atimia confusa (Say, 1826)
 Atimia gannoni Hovore & Giesbert, 1974
 Atimia helenae Linsley, 1934
 Atimia hoppingi Linsley, 1939
 Atimia huachucae Champlain & Knull, 1922
 Atimia mexicana Linsley, 1934
 Atimia vandykei Linsley, 1939
 Genus Paratimia
 Paratimia conicola Fisher, 1915

References

Spondylidinae